Porto Cheli Airfield  was a private airfield located near Porto Cheli, Argolis, Greece. It belongs to company T. Alexiou S.A. and it has ceased operations since 2008.

History 
The airfield mainly operated during the 1960s and 1970s. It belonged to businessman Tasos Alexiou. During the Greek military junta, there was interest in construction of a new airport closer to Porto Cheli, but it was never realized due to scandalous compensations that were given. In 2004, HCAA closed the airport due to required maintenance issues and in 2008 that the airfield's certificate expired, it was not renewed, thus closing the airport indefinitely.

In June 2022 the land was sold to  Paul Coulson, who is the largest shareholder and chairman of Ardagh Group., for an estimated amount of €50Μ. which is the most expensive land sell ever been in Greece.

References 

 Aerial photos of the airport and surrounding property.
 Dedicated album with multimedia from the airport

Airports in Greece
Defunct airports in Greece
Buildings and structures in Argolis
Transport infrastructure in Peloponnese (region)
Airports disestablished in 2004